San Antonio Abad may refer to

 Anthony the Great (251–356), or San Antonio Abad, a Christian monk and saint from Egypt
 San Antonio Abad, Cartagena, a district in Cartagena, Spain
 San Antonio Abad metro station, a Mexico City Metro station
 San Antonio Abad National University in Cusco, a public university in Cusco, Peru
 Fort San Antonio Abad, a fortification in the Malate district of the City of Manila, Philippines

See also 

 Antonio Abad
 Sant'Antonio (disambiguation)
 Sant'Antonio Abate (disambiguation)